Cédric Toussaint (born 29 March 2001) is a Canadian professional soccer player who plays as a midfielder for Pacific FC in the Canadian Premier League.

Early life
Toussaint began playing soccer at age four with AS Pointe-aux-Trembles. Afterwards, he played for CS Rivière-des-Prairies, CS Panellinios, and CS Mercier-Hochelaga-Maisonneuve. In 2013, he moved to the Montreal Impact Academy, where he spent eight years until signing a professional contract in 2020. In 2020, he played with the revived Montreal Impact U23.

Club career
In November 2020, Toussaint signed his first professional contract with Canadian Premier League side York United, a two-year deal with multiple club options.

In November 2021, Toussaint signed an extension with York United until 2024. During the 2022 season, he received two red cards, both against Atlético Ottawa. During his time with York, he made 43 appearances, across all competitions.

In August 2022, Toussaint transferred to fellow CPL club Pacific FC mid-season on a permanent deal, in exchange for York receiving Matthew Baldisimo on loan. He made his debut for Pacific against HFX Wanderers on August 20. In November 2022, Pacific confirmed his return for the 2023 season.

International career
In 2016, he attended a camp with the Canada U15 team. In 2020, he was invited to train with the Canada U23 team ahead of the 2020 CONCACAF Men's Olympic Qualifying Championship, but the tournament was postponed until 2021.

Personal life
Toussaint is the son of Haitian-Canadian coach and former footballer Jean-Robert Toussaint.

References

External links

2001 births
Living people
Association football midfielders
Canadian soccer players
Soccer players from Montreal
Sportspeople from Drummondville
Canadian sportspeople of Haitian descent
Haitian Quebecers
York United FC players
Pacific FC players
Canadian Premier League players